Wen Qiang (January 29, 1956 – July 7, 2010 in Zengjia town, Shapingba, Chongqing) was a Chinese judicial official who was arrested and executed during the Chongqing gang trials.

Career
Wen Qiang was the most prominent among the officials charged in Bo Xilai's campaign against organized crime in the summer of 2009. He was the former Chongqing Public Security Bureau's executive deputy head for 16 years and head of the city's Judicial Bureau (Su Wei et al., 2011:26-27). He was also known as a crime-buster, having arrested notorious gang leader and bank stealer Zhang Jun in September 2000. Wen Qiang's home reportedly sat on a 20 mu lot and had a market value of 30 million yuan (“Chongqing dahei gushi,” 2009)

Prosecution and death
Wen was charged with taking more than 12 million yuan ($1.76 m) in bribes. He was also charged with repeatedly raping a university student. Wen was tried in February 2010, along with his wife, Zhou Xiaoya, and three other senior Chongqing police officials.

Wen was convicted and sentenced to death. His appeal in May 2010 was overturned and he was executed in July. Wen's wife and the three associates were jailed.

References

1956 births
2010 deaths
21st-century executions by China
Chinese politicians executed for corruption
Expelled members of the Chinese Communist Party
People's Republic of China politicians from Chongqing
Chinese Communist Party politicians from Chongqing
People executed by China by lethal injection
Executed people from Chongqing
Chinese police officers
People executed for murder